The Basilica of San Vitale is a late antique church in Ravenna, Italy. The sixth-century church is an important surviving example of early Christian Byzantine art and architecture. It is one of eight structures in Ravenna inscribed on the UNESCO World Heritage List. Its foundational inscription describes the church as a basilica, though its centrally-planned design is not typical of the basilica form. Within the Roman Catholic Church it holds the honorific title of basilica for its historic and ecclesial importance.

History

The church's construction began in 526 on the orders of Bishop Ecclesius of Ravenna. At the time, Ravenna was under the rule of the Ostrogoths. Bishop Maximian completed construction in 547, preceding Justinian's creation of the Exarchate of Ravenna, which followed his partial re-conquest of the Western Roman Empire.

The construction of the church was sponsored by local banker and architect Julius Argentarius. Very little is known of Julius, but he also sponsored the construction of the nearby Basilica of Sant'Apollinare in Classe at around the same time. A donor portrait of Julius Argentarius may appear among the courtiers on the Justinian mosaic. The final cost amounted to 26,000 solidi equal to 36.11 lbs of gold. It has been suggested that Julius originated in the eastern part of the Byzantine Empire, where there was a long-standing tradition of public benefactions.

The central vault used a western technique of hollow tubes inserted into each other, rather than bricks. This method was the first recorded structural use of terra-cotta forms, which later evolved into modern structural clay tile. The ambulatory and gallery were vaulted only later in the Middle Ages.

The Baroque frescoes on the dome were made between 1778 and 1782 by S. Barozzi, Ubaldo Gandolfi and Jacopo Guarana.

Architecture

The main building of the church is laid out octagonally. The building combines Roman and Byzantine elements. The dome, shape of doorways, and stepped towers are typical of Roman style, while the polygonal apse, capitals, narrow bricks, and an early example of flying buttresses are typical of the Byzantine. The church is most famous for its wealth of Byzantine mosaics. St Vitale boasts the largest and best-preserved mosaics outside of Istanbul. The church is of extreme importance in Byzantine art, as it is the only major church from the period of the Emperor Justinian I to survive virtually intact. Furthermore, it is thought to reflect the design of the Byzantine Imperial Palace Audience Chamber, of which nothing at all survives. The bell tower has four bells. The tenor bell dates to the 16th century. According to legends, the church was erected on the site of the martyrdom of Saint Vitalis. However, there is some confusion as to whether this is the Saint Vitalis of Milan, or the Saint Vitale whose body was discovered (together with that of Saint Agricola) by Saint Ambrose in Bologna in 393.

Mosaic art

The central section is surrounded by two superposed ambulatories. The upper one, the matrimoneum, was possibly reserved for married women. A series of mosaics in the lunettes above the triforia depict sacrifices from the Old Testament: the story of Abraham and Melchizedek, and the Sacrifice of Isaac; the story of Moses and the Burning Bush, Jeremiah and Isaiah, representatives of the twelve tribes of Israel, and the story of Abel and Cain. A pair of angels, holding a medallion with a cross, crowns each lunette. On the side walls the corners, next to the mullioned windows, have mosaics of the Four Evangelists, under their symbols (angel, lion, ox and eagle), and dressed in white. Especially the portrayal of the lion is remarkable in its ferocity.

The cross-ribbed vault in the presbytery is richly ornamented with mosaic festoons of leaves, fruit and flowers, converging on a crown encircling the Lamb of God. The crown is supported by four angels, and every surface is covered with a profusion of flowers, stars, birds and animals, including many peacocks. Above the arch, on both sides, two angels hold a disc and beside them a representation of the cities of Jerusalem and Bethlehem. They symbolize the human race (Jerusalem representing the Jews, and Bethlehem the Gentiles).

All these mosaics are executed in the Hellenistic-Roman tradition: lively and imaginative, with rich colours and a certain perspective, and with a vivid depiction of the landscape, plants and birds. They were finished when Ravenna was still under Gothic rule . The apse is flanked by two chapels, the prothesis and the diaconicon, typical for Byzantine architecture.

Inside, the intrados of the great triumphal arch is decorated with fifteen mosaic medallions, depicting Jesus Christ, the twelve Apostles and Saint Gervasius and Saint Protasius, the sons of Saint Vitale. The theophany was begun in 525 under bishop Ecclesius. It has a great gold fascia with twining flowers, birds, and horns of plenty. Jesus Christ appears, seated on a blue globe at the summit of the vault, robed in purple, flanked by angels, offering with his right hand the martyr's crown to Saint Vitale, while on his left Bishop Ecclesius offers a model of the church.

Justinian and Theodora panels 

At the foot of the apse side walls are two famous mosaic panels, completed in 547.  On the right is a mosaic depicting the East Roman Emperor Justinian I, clad in Tyrian purple with a golden halo, standing next to court officials, generals Belisarius and Narses, Bishop Maximian, palatinae guards and deacons. The halo around his head gives him the same aspect as Christ in the dome of the apse, but is part of the tradition of rendering the imperial family with haloes described by Ernst Kantorowicz in The King's Two Bodies.  Justinian himself stands in the middle, with soldiers on his right and clergy on his left, emphasizing that Justinian is the leader of both church and state of his empire. The later insertion of Bishop Maximian's name above his head suggests that the mosaic may have been modified in 547, replacing the representation of the prior bishop with that of Maximian's.

The gold background of the mosaic shows that Justinian and his entourage are inside the church. The figures are placed in a V shape; Justinian is placed in the front and in the middle to show his importance with Bishop Maximian on his left and lesser individuals being placed behind them. This placement can be seen through the overlapping feet of the individuals present in the mosaic.

Another panel shows Empress Theodora solemn and formal, with a golden halo, crown and jewels, and a group of court women as well as eunuchs. The Empress holds the Eucharistic vessel for the Precious Blood, and her panel differs from that of Justinian in having a more complex background, with a fountain, cupola, and lavish hangings.

Gallery

See also
A La Ronde, an 18th-century house in Devon, England, that is supposedly based on the Basilica.
List of Roman domes
History of Roman and Byzantine domes

References

Further reading

External links

History of Byzantine Architecture: San Vitale (photos)
Great Buildings On-line: San Vitale (photos)
Adrian Fletcher's Paradoxplace Ravenna Pages  (photos)

547
6th-century churches
Byzantine sacred architecture
Vitale
Palaeo-Christian architecture in Ravenna
Octagonal churches in Italy
Buildings of Justinian I
World Heritage Sites in Italy
Early Christian art